Wanping may refer to:

Wanping, Hunan (万坪), a town in Yongshun County, Hunan, China
Wanping Fortress, a walled fortress in Beijing, China

See also
Wangping (disambiguation)